Andrew Ranjan Perera was a Sri Lankan Judge appointed as the Chief Justice of Seychelles in 2008.

He was a former Judge Puisne Justice of the Supreme Court of Sri Lanka.

External links
Lankan judge sworn-in as Seychelles’ CJ
 President James Michel has confirmed Judge Andrew Ranjan Perera in the post of Chief Justice

Year of birth missing (living people)
Living people
Puisne Justices of the Supreme Court of Sri Lanka
Sinhalese judges
Seychellois people of Sri Lankan descent
Chief justices of Seychelles
Sri Lankan judges on the courts of Seychelles